The Turner Broadcasting tower was a  free-standing lattice tower in Atlanta, Georgia. It was located next to the Downtown Connector between Spring, West Peachtree, 10th and 12th Streets in Midtown. The tower had a triangular cross-section and was built on the site of a previous four-sided broadcast tower built for WAGA-TV 5 and to serve WJRJ-TV which was founded by Rice Broadcasting Inc. which was owned by a local Atlanta entrepreneur, Jack M. Rice, Jr. It is the tallest freestanding structure to ever be voluntarily removed in the United States and second tallest in the world.

History 
At the time of its completion it was one of the ten tallest freestanding structure in the world behind only the Ostankino Tower, Empire State Building, Tokyo Tower, WITI TV Tower, Eiffel Tower, WHDH-TV tower, Chrysler Building and the KCTV Broadcast Tower. The construction of tower was financed by GE, which also provided the original channel 17 transmitter. The tower was completed in 1967 and the first broadcast from the tower came on September 1, 1967, under the WJRJ-TV call letters, operating on UHF channel 17. The towers height gave Channel 17 a strong signal boost which greatly helped UHF broadcasts as this era featured low-sensitivity tuners and lousy antennas.

In July 1969, Rice Broadcasting reached an agreement to merge with the Turner Communications Corporation and the tower was formally named the Turner Broadcasting tower thereafter. Although the tower was owned by Turner Broadcasting System parent Time Warner, it was on a land lease from Comcast, a competing cable TV company.  This is the result of WAGA having been owned by Storer Broadcasting, while Storer Cable went through a series of acquisitions that found it folded into Comcast.  Storer leased the land to WJRJ, which later became WTCG when purchased by Ted Turner, and was best known as "superstation" WTBS (now TBS on cable/satellite and Peachtree TV over-the-air).  Turner later sold his TV networks (including CNN, TBS, and others) and the TV station to Time Warner.

Dismantling 
The tower was disassembled in late 2010, with analog WPCH-TV 17 having been discontinued by, and tenants WNNX FM 100.5 and WWWQ FM 99.7 moving their auxiliary/backup facilities elsewhere. The lease apparently was on the condition that the tower be removed when it would no longer be used for broadcasting, a condition which was finally triggered by the mandated shutdown of analog TV law in June 2009. The digital TV transmission for WPCH-TV 20 (17.1) is now from the North Druid Hills site, along with several other local FM and TV stations, including WWWQ FM 99.7.  WNNX FM 100.5 is now back at the Westin Peachtree Plaza Hotel, where it was first located after being moved-in from Alabama as WWWQ FM 100.5, before briefly moving to the Turner tower and back again.

The Turner Broadcasting tower remains the tallest tower of any type to ever be demolished and the tallest freestanding structure to ever be voluntarily removed in the USA.

See also 
 Lattice tower
 List of tallest freestanding structures
 List of tallest demolished freestanding structures
 List of tallest freestanding steel structures

References

External links 
 Emporis.com
 https://www.fybush.com/sites/2010/tbs-draft.html
 http://wireless2.fcc.gov/UlsApp/AsrSearch/asrRegistration.jsp?regKey=606742
 "TBS tower rich in memories, history — and a few notable tales", Bill Tush, Atlanta Journal-Constitution, November 23, 2010

Lattice towers
Towers in Georgia (U.S. state)
Buildings and structures demolished in 2010
Former radio masts and towers
Demolished buildings and structures in Atlanta
Buildings and structures completed in 1967